Jamboree was a British children's television programme that aired on CITV from 1998 until 2001. Jamboree was produced by Floella Benjamin Productions for XL Entertainment, a production company based in Chichester, United Kingdom. It was primarily aimed at its target audience of pre-school children.

About the show
Each episode starts with Benjamin introducing each character known as the "Bopkins". They could be seen making their beds before heading over to a personal computer. One of the characters would then put a compact disc into the disc drive. They would then take it in turns to choose an icon. A short segment would then be shown. Each episode would start and end on a segment called "Floella's house".

Series 1 (1998)
Numbers - 2 June 1998
Up And Down - 9 June 1998
Animals - 16 June 1998
Lets Dance - 23 June 1998
Sizes - 30 June 1998
Making Things - 7 July 1998
Differences - 14 July 1998
Golf - 21 July 1998
Food - 28 July 1998
The Seaside - 4 August 1998
Shapes - 11 August 1998
Friends - 18 August 1998
Dressing Up - 25 August 1998

Series 2 (1999)
Parties - 8 June 1999
Making Paper Aeroplanes - 15 June 1999
Bodies - 22 June 1999
Music - 29 June 1999
Colours - 6 July 1999
Daytime And Nighttime - 13 July 1999
Games - 20 July 1999
Weather And Travelling - 27 July 1999
Time - 3 August 1999
Puzzle Time - 17 July 1999
Plants And Nature - 24 August 1999
Things In The Sky - 9 September 1999

Series 3 (2000)
Magic - 10 May 2000
Red - 17 May 2000
Opposites - 24 May 2000
Soft And Hard - 31 May 2000
ABC's - 7 June 2000
Big And Small - 14 June 2000
Old Things And New Things - 21 June 2000
Odd Numbers - 28 June 2000
Baking A Cake - 5 July 2000
Reading Books - 12 July 2000
Blue - 19 July 2000
In And Out - 26 July 2000

Series 4 (2001)
Farms - 30 April 2001
Breaking - 1 May 2001
Hot And Cold - 2 May 2001
Relations - 3 May 2001
Loud And Quiet - 4 May 2001
Illness - 8 May 2001
Even Numbers - 9 May 2001
Pictures - 10 May 2001
Trees - 11 May 2001
Sharing - 14 May 2001
Water - 15 May 2001
Yellow - 16 May 2001
Rubbish - 17 May 2001
Heavy And Light - 24 May 2001
Episode 15–29 May 2001
Episode 16–30 May 2001

Characters
The series featured four main characters. These were Bizza Bopkin, Billy Bopkin, Betty Bopkin (played by Sammy Davis) and Baby Bopkin (played by Warwick Davis.)

Segments
Floella's house
A live action segment at the start and end of each episode. Floella plays games and sings songs with a group of children in her garden. At the end of each episode she would use the catchphrase "Until next time from them and me ... It's goodbye from Jamboree".

Meme and Scruff
The antics of two friends. A dog and a monkey in stop motion.

Playtime
Live action with children narrating while playing a game.

Storytime
A classic story acted out with no talking and much movement, often with Benjamin starring and a narrator.

Video fun
A live action educational video clip.

VHS tapes
Animals and Music Fun (1999)
Numbers and Colour Fun (2000)
Let’s Dance Dressing Up and Puzzle Time (2001)

References

External links
 Production website

1998 British television series debuts
1990s British children's television series
2000s British children's television series
2001 British television series endings
British preschool education television series
English-language television shows